"The Courtship of Stewie's Father" is the 16th episode of the fourth season of Family Guy, which originally aired on November 20, 2005. The episode sees Peter attempt to bond with Stewie after realizing that Stewie enjoys seeing Lois get hurt. After things go too far and Lois confronts Peter over the escalating pranks, Stewie feels betrayed, prompting a repentant Peter to take him to Walt Disney World Resort. Meanwhile, Chris is made to assist Herbert in his household chores after breaking his window, much to the delight of Herbert.

Plot
After failing to receive the Employee of the Month award at Pawtucket Brewery, Peter attempts to charm his supervisor, Angela, who is unimpressed by his work performance. He organizes a surprise cockfight in her house since she likes animals, but she returns to find the remains of several chickens who have killed each other. When his retarded co-worker, Opie, gets promoted and replaced by Soundwave from the Transformers, Peter still fails to win Employee of the Month. After speaking with Stewie's preschool teacher, Lois discovers several graphic pictures Stewie has drawn that show him killing her. She is oblivious to the obvious interpretation and instead notes that Peter is not included in any of the pictures.

Lois suggests that Peter make more effort to bond with Stewie. Peter reluctantly agrees, but fails to make headway until—while helping Lois in the kitchen—he accidentally knocks a box off a high shelf in the kitchen, hitting Lois in the head, causing Stewie to laugh hysterically. After striking her with larger boxes and then a jar, and seeing Stewie's delight, Peter interprets Lois being hurt as a sign of father-son bonding. This prompts more vicious pranks on Lois, including spraying her with a water hose while she is in the bathroom, but culminating with an incident where Peter pushes her into the cargo area of the station wagon before driving it into the lake. Peter and Stewie enjoy their bonding time and Stewie even begins to dress just like Peter. Later, a furious Lois returns home and—after sending Stewie to his room—demands an explanation from Peter. When Peter fails to win his argument and he realizes he went too far, Stewie feels betrayed and refuses to talk to his father.

To make amends with Stewie after using Brian's advice, Peter takes him to Walt Disney World Resort in Florida. Excited at the prospect of visiting Disney World, Stewie forgives Peter, although pretending to be annoyed. When the pair arrive, Peter inadvertently loses Stewie, who is captured by Disney World employees and forced to sing at the Tiny World ride, complying to do so  after learning that the alternative is to be in a Christmas movie with Tim Allen. Peter finds him and takes him away, but is chased across the theme park by a security guard, who eventually loses them in The Temple of Doom style (with Peter dressed as Indiana Jones and Stewie as Short Round). The pair return home after a brief encounter with Michael Eisner and Stewie's faith in Peter is restored.

Meanwhile, after playing baseball in the street, Chris accidentally smashes his neighbor Herbert's window. In an attempt to repay his debt to Herbert, Chris agrees to help the elderly man in his household chores, much to Herbert's delight. Herbert takes Chris to dinner at a fine restaurant, where a photographer takes their photograph. Herbert then sings "Somewhere That's Green", envisioning a family life with Chris, but he falls asleep at the table after the song ends. In the coda, Herbert and his dog, Jesse, mope around the house until the ESPN Little League World Series comes on, perking up Herbert's spirits.

Production

This is the first storyline the show has produced which focuses largely on Herbert. Originally, the Herbert storyline was designed to be longer, and several other gags had been created showing Herbert attempting to come on to Chris, but broadcasting standards were nervous about the episode and forced the show to reduce the amount of time spent on the storyline.  When Herbert comes to the house to tell Peter and Lois that Chris broke his window, he was meant to say more, but it was cut; one scene was intended to have Peter replying with "If he wants you to do a job, give him the best job you've ever given". When Quagmire is describing how he seduced two homeless twins, Fox censored the gesture which saw Quagmire pretending to put his hand up a woman's vagina (along with many other implied sexual acts) and showed Peter covering Stewie's ears. When God speaks to his lover after being telephoned by Jesus, he asks her "where were we", which she replies with "right about here" and hands him a condom. After telling her it's his birthday (so he won't have to use it), she replies a firm "no". The gag was designed in this way because broadcasting standards wanted to portray the message that God would not have unprotected sex.

Upon learning he has lost Stewie, a deleted scene was created showing Peter listing things he was going to do before finding Stewie, always leaving Stewie at the end of the list and putting his own needs before Stewie's.

Show producer Seth MacFarlane comments that the aftermath of the cockfight which Peter arranged was "a great drawing by Kurt Dumas". MacFarlane comments that it was "amazing lighting" on the flying car scene and that it is "so cool-looking". Stewie going crazy with excitement after learning Peter is taking him to Disney World is described by MacFarlane to be "a great piece of animation", and the scene "is a little more crazy than they [the show] normally go". In the DVD commentary, MacFarlane describes the vocal performance by Mike Henry, when singing as Herbert, to be "nothing short of brilliant", adding that "there's so much feeling in the song, you almost root for Herbert to get at least a wink from Chris".

MacFarlane made the sound effects of Stewie and Peter laughing excessively after attacking Lois, with no sounds of laughter being used from previous episodes. MacFarlane comments that he was "sweaty and exhausted after it". The reaction to the "Peanut Butter Jelly Time" scene astonished MacFarlane, as he believes it has become repetitious and annoying after he visited a karaoke bar in Hollywood and the club played it excessively. This scene was recreated in the ninth-season episode "The Big Bang Theory" with Stewie being the one in the banana.

Cultural references
The flying car scene is a reference to the 1989 sequel-film Back to the Future Part II.
The song Herbert is singing when dreaming of living with Chris is the song "Somewhere That's Green" from the musical Little Shop of Horrors.
The security guard chasing Peter and Stewie in to the "Indiana Jones Ride" (allusion to the Indiana Jones Adventure which is actually at Disneyland in California and not in Florida where the episode takes place), as well as the following encounter with Michael Eisner, is a reference to the climax of Indiana Jones and the Temple of Doom.
When Peter encounters the crows from Dumbo, he remarks about their racial stereotyping.
Stewie is put to work on "It's a Tiny World", which is a parody of It's a Small World.
Peter and Stewie dropping Lois in the lake may be a reference to '97 Bonnie & Clyde by Eminem.

Reception
The episode was watched by over 9 million people on its original airdate. The Parents Television Council, a frequent critic of the show, reacted negatively to the episode, branding it the "Worst show of the week" on August 17, 2006, calling it a "sheer vulgar storyline." In a review of the episode by TV Squad, Ryan J. Budge noted "Tonight was another great episode of Family Guy," adding that "these episodes keep getting better and better."

References

External links

 

Family Guy (season 4) episodes
2005 American television episodes